Vladimir Denisov may refer to:

 Vladimir Denisov (ice hockey) (born 1984), Belarusian ice hockey player
 Vladimir Denisov (fencer) (born 1947), Russian Olympic fencer